Margaret Isobel Lister (née Sweeney, born ) is a former New Zealand swimmer who represented her country at the 1950 Empire Games in Auckland. She later took up long-distance swimming, and in 1955 became the first person to swim the length of Lake Taupo.

Biography
Representing Auckland, Sweeney won two titles at the New Zealand national swimming championships: the 220 yards breaststroke in 1949; and the 100 yards breaststroke the following year. She went on to represent New Zealand at the 1950 British Empire Games in Auckland, finishing sixth in the 220 yards breaststroke with a time of 3:28.0. She was also a member of the New Zealand team in the 330 yards medley relay, with Jean Stewart and Winifred Griffin, that was disqualified in the final.

Sweeney then turned to long-distance swimming, and worked as a professional swimming coach at the Tepid Baths in Auckland. On 30 January 1955, she became the first person to swim the length of Lake Taupo, making the  crossing from south to north in 13 hours 39 minutes. The feat would not be repeated until 1977 when local man Patrick Cox completed the marathon swim.

Sweeney made four attempts to swim the English Channel, in 1954, 1955 and 1968, but was unsuccessful on each occasion. In 1955, she was within  of reaching the English coast when the tide changed and pushed her back; she finally abandoned the attempt after 12 hours in the water.

In 1956, Sweeney married Keith Richard Lister in Essex, England. The couple went on to have three sons, and ran a supermarket at Forrest Hill on Auckland's North Shore.

References

External links
Photograph of Margaret Sweeney completing swim of Lake Taupo

Swimmers from Auckland
New Zealand female swimmers
Swimmers at the 1950 British Empire Games
Commonwealth Games competitors for New Zealand
New Zealand long-distance swimmers
Female long-distance swimmers
20th-century births
Living people
Year of birth missing (living people)